Robert Leonard Bradley (born December 15, 1980) is a former minor league baseball pitcher.

Bradley attended Wellington Community High School in Wellington, Florida, where he was named a High School All-American.  He was chosen by the Pittsburgh Pirates with the eighth overall selection in the 1999 Major League Baseball Draft.  Though he signed a letter of intent with Florida State University, Bradley signed with the Pirates for a $2.3 million bonus.

Bradley participated in the All-Star Futures Game in 2000.  Prior to the 2001 season, Baseball America rated Bradley as the #20 prospect in baseball. However, Bradley suffered many injuries. He required arthroscopic surgery in June 2001, and missed the remainder of the season.  Though he required Tommy John surgery in October 2001 and missed the 2002 season as a result, he was nevertheless added to the 40-man roster following the season.  He required surgery again in 2003.  Bradley struggled when he reached Triple-A in 2005, and he was unconditionally released to make room on the roster for Zach Duke.  Bradley went to camp with the Florida Marlins in 2006, but left after one day.

References

External links

1980 births
Living people
Gulf Coast Pirates players
Hickory Crawdads players
Lynchburg Hillcats players
Altoona Curve players
Indianapolis Indians players
Baseball pitchers
Sportspeople from West Palm Beach, Florida
Baseball players from Florida
People from Wellington, Florida